Transcription factor AP-4 (activating enhancer binding protein 4), also known as TFAP4, is a protein which in humans is encoded by the TFAP4  gene.

Function 

Transcription factor AP4 is a member of the basic helix-loop-helix (bHLH) transcription factors, which bind to the E-box sequence in the promoters of their target genes. AP-4 has been shown to act both as a repressor and an activator for different target genes.

References

Further reading

External links 
 

Transcription factors